Live & Acoustic is a live album by Australian pop singer-songwriter Missy Higgins.

Background and release
On 8 November 2005, Missy Higgins was recorded live at the San Francisco Apple Store's theater. The album was part of a series of in-store appearances that were recorded by Apple and released exclusively through the iTunes Store.

Track listing
 "All for Believing" (Intro) – 0:40		
 "All for Believing" – 3:10		
 "Ten Days" (Intro) – 0:17		
 "Ten Days" – 3:41
 "The Special Two" (Intro) – 0:36		
 "The Special Two" – 4:26
 "Scar" (Intro) – 0:28
 "Scar" – 3:43
 "This is How it Goes" – 3:58

References

2005 live albums
ITunes Session
Missy Higgins albums
Live albums by Australian artists